Tarphius floresensis is a beetle species in the family Zopheridae endemic to Flores Island (Azores). It is commonly named as an iron-clad beetle in English or Escaravelho-cascudo-da-mata in Portuguese. The genus Tarphius is evolutionarily old species to Azores.

Description and ecology 
The medium size of the beetle is less than half centimeters. It has small setae on its body, which makes the beetle to look "hairy". The general colour of the beetle is reddish or reddish-brown to dark brown. The dorsal part of the beetle is arcuate, dorsal surface is with dense rounded granules, each has one light setae on top.

The beetle does not fly.

The species occurs in the altitude of 300-1000 m and can be found in wet places, as slopes near rivers. The species occurs mainly in soil, but can also be found under the bark of old trees. Interestingly, it has been found under both, endemic and exotic trees. The beetle is present in some larger and well-preserved patches of native forests of the island. Tarphius is a Fungivorous beetle and is active at night.

Distribution 
Tarphius floresensis is endemic to Flores Island (Azores), Portugal. It has been found in Natural Forest Reserve of Morro Alto and Pico da Sé and Natural Forest Reserve of Caldeiras Funda and Rasa.

Conservation status 
Tarphius floresensis is considered as critically endangered species according to IUCN Red List. It is mostly threatened by habitat loss due to non-native invasive species and the change of land use. The most problematic invasive species reducing the habitats is Hedychium gardnerianum, which is introduced to the island as a decorative plant. 

On the scope of a LIFE Programme (Life Beetles), awareness is being raisen among locals about the beetle and the following conservation actions are carried out: 

- Control invasive flora species such as ginger lily (Hedychium gardnerianum), sweet pittosporum (Pittosporum undulatum) and earleaf nightshade (Solanum mauritianum) along the riverbed; 

- Apply Nature-based solutions (NBS) to control erosion, prevent natural hazards and create favorable habitat for the project target species.

- Restoring strategical habitat areas through the removal of Invasive species and by planting native species;

- Promote the habitat connectivity of the species.

References 

Zopheridae
Beetles described in 2017
Beetles of North America